This is a list of the mammal species recorded in Trinidad and Tobago. These are the volant (flying) and terrestrial mammal species recorded for Trinidad and Tobago, and aquatic/marine species. Of these none are endangered and one is considered vulnerable. However, it is very important to note that many mammals are locally threatened in Trinidad and Tobago due mainly to heavy hunting and poaching, as well as habitat loss and fragmentation, with a number of species already having been extirpated on the island of Tobago. This list is derived from the IUCN Red List which lists species of mammals and includes those mammals that have recently been classified as extinct (since 1500 AD). The taxonomy and naming of the individual species is based on those used in existing Wikipedia articles as of 21 May 2007 and supplemented by the common names and taxonomy from the IUCN, Smithsonian Institution, or University of Michigan where no Wikipedia article was available.

Species found in Tobago are indicated in brackets after their name, in total there are 24 bats and 16 non-volant terrestrial mammals recorded for Tobago.

The following tags are used to highlight each species' conservation status as assessed by the International Union for Conservation of Nature:

Some species were assessed using an earlier set of criteria. Species assessed using this system have the following instead of near threatened and least concern categories:

Subclass: Theria

Infraclass: Metatheria

Order: Didelphimorphia (common opossums)

Didelphimorphia is the order of common opossums of the Western Hemisphere. Opossums probably diverged from the basic South American marsupials in the late Cretaceous or early Paleocene. They are small to medium-sized marsupials, about the size of a large house cat, with a long snout and prehensile tail.

Family: Didelphidae (American opossums)
Subfamily: Caluromyinae
Genus: Caluromys
 Bare-tailed woolly opossum, C. philander LR/nt
Subfamily: Didelphinae
Genus: Chironectes
 Water opossum, Chironectes minimus LC
Genus: Didelphis
 Common opossum, Didelphis marsupialis LC
Genus: Marmosa
 Linnaeus's mouse opossum, Marmosa murina LR/lc
 Robinson's mouse opossum, Marmosa robinsoni LR/lc
Genus: Marmosops
 Dusky slender opossum, Marmosops fuscatus LR/nt

Infraclass: Eutheria

Order: Sirenia (manatees and dugongs)

Sirenia is an order of fully aquatic, herbivorous mammals that inhabit rivers, estuaries, coastal marine waters, swamps, and marine wetlands. All four species are endangered.

Family: Trichechidae
Genus: Trichechus
 West Indian manatee, T. manatus

Order: Cingulata (armadillos)

The armadillos are small mammals with a bony armored shell. They are native to the Americas. There are around 20 extant species.

Family: Dasypodidae (armadillos)
Subfamily: Dasypodinae
Genus: Dasypus
 Nine-banded armadillo, Dasypus novemcinctus LC

Order: Pilosa (anteaters, sloths and tamanduas)

The order Pilosa is extant only in the Americas and includes the anteaters, sloths, and tamanduas.

Suborder: Vermilingua
Family: Cyclopedidae
Genus: Cyclopes
 Silky anteater, Cyclopes didactylus LC
Family: Myrmecophagidae (American anteaters)
Genus: Tamandua
 Southern tamandua, Tamandua tetradactyla LC

Order: Primates

The order Primates contains humans and their closest relatives: lemurs, lorisoids, tarsiers, monkeys, and apes.

Suborder: Haplorhini
Infraorder: Simiiformes
Parvorder: Platyrrhini (New World monkeys)
Family: Cebidae
Subfamily: Cebinae
Genus: Cebus
 Trinidad white-fronted capuchin, C. trinitatis CR
Genus: Sapajus
 Tufted capuchin, S. apella LC introduced
Family: Atelidae
Subfamily: Alouattinae
Genus: Alouatta
 Guyanese red howler, Alouatta macconnelli LC

Order: Rodentia (rodents)

Rodents make up the largest order of mammals, with over 40% of mammalian species. They have two incisors in the upper and lower jaw which grow continually and must be kept short by gnawing.

Suborder: Hystricognathi
Family: Erethizontidae (New World porcupines)
Subfamily: Erethizontinae
Genus: Coendou
 Brazilian porcupine, Coendou prehensilis LR/lc
Family: Caviidae 
Subfamily: Hydrochoerinae
Genus: Hydrochoerus
 Capybara, Hydrochoerus hydrochaeris LR/lc introduced
Family: Cuniculidae
Genus: Cuniculus
 Lowland paca, Cuniculus paca LC
Family: Dasyproctidae
Genus: Dasyprocta
 Red-rumped agouti, Dasyprocta leporina LC
Family: Echimyidae
Subfamily: Echimyinae
Genus: Makalata
 Brazilian spiny tree-rat, Makalata didelphoides LR/lc
Subfamily: Eumysopinae
Genus: Proechimys
 Trinidad spiny rat, Proechimys trinitatis LR/lc
Suborder: Sciurognathi
Family: Sciuridae (squirrels)
Subfamily: Sciurinae
Tribe: Sciurini
Genus: Sciurus
 Red-tailed squirrel, Sciurus granatensis LR/lc
Family: Heteromyidae
Subfamily: Heteromyinae
Genus: Heteromys
 Trinidad spiny pocket mouse, Heteromys anomalus LR/lc
Family: Cricetidae
Subfamily: Sigmodontinae
Genus: Akodon
 Northern grass mouse, Necromys urichi LR/lc
Genus: Nectomys
 Trinidad water rat, Nectomys palmipes LR/lc 
Genus: Oecomys
 Savanna arboreal rice rat, Oecomys speciosus LR/lc
 Trinidad arboreal rice rat, Oecomys trinitatis LR/lc
Genus: Hylaeamys
 Azara's broad-headed rice rat, Hylaeamys megacephalus LR/lc
Genus: Rhipidomys
 Coues's climbing mouse, Rhipidomys couesi LR/lc 
 Venezuelan climbing mouse, Rhipidomys venezuelae LR/lc (Tobago only)
Genus: Zygodontomys
 Short-tailed cane rat, Zygodontomys brevicauda LR/lc

Order: Chiroptera (bats)

The bats' most distinguishing feature is that their forelimbs are developed as wings, making them the only mammals capable of flight. Bat species account for about 20% of all mammals.

Family: Noctilionidae
Genus: Noctilio
 Greater bulldog bat, Noctilio leporinus LR/lc
Family: Natalidae
Genus: Natalus
 Trinidadian funnel-eared bat, Natalus tumidirostris LR/lc 
Family: Vespertilionidae
Subfamily: Myotinae
Genus: Myotis
 Attenborough's myotis, Myotis attenboroughi LR/lc (Tobago only)
 Black myotis, Myotis nigricans LR/lc
 Hairy-legged myotis, Myotis keaysi pilosatibialis LR/lc (Trinidad only)
 Riparian myotis, Myotis riparius LR/lc
Subfamily: Vespertilioninae
Genus: Eptesicus
 Brazilian brown bat, Eptesicus brasiliensis LR/lc
Genus: Lasiurus
 Desert red bat, Lasiurus blossevillii LR/lc (Trinidad only)
 Southern yellow bat, Lasiurus ega LR/lc
Genus: Rhogeessa
 Thomas's yellow bat, Rhogeessa io LR/lc
Family: Molossidae
Genus: Cynomops
 Greenhall's dog-faced bat, Cynomops greenhalli LR/lc
Genus: Eumops
 Black bonneted bat, Eumops auripendulus LR/lc
Genus: Molossus
 Black mastiff bat, Molossus ater LR/lc
 Velvety free-tailed bat, Molossus molossus LR/lc
 Sinaloan mastiff bat, Molossus sinaloae LR/lc
Genus: Nyctinomops
 Broad-eared bat, Nyctinomops laticaudatus LR/lc
Genus: Promops
 Big crested mastiff bat, Promops centralis LR/lc
 Brown mastiff bat, Promops nasutus LR/lc
Genus: Tadarida
 Mexican free-tailed bat, Tadarida brasiliensis LR/nt 
Family: Emballonuridae
Genus: Diclidurus
 Northern ghost bat, Diclidurus albus LR/lc
Genus: Peropteryx
 Trinidad dog-like bat, Peropteryx trinitatis 
Genus: Rhynchonycteris
 Proboscis bat, Rhynchonycteris naso LR/lc
Genus: Saccopteryx
 Greater sac-winged bat, Saccopteryx bilineata LR/lc
 Lesser sac-winged bat, Saccopteryx leptura LR/lc
Family: Mormoopidae
Genus: Mormoops
 Ghost-faced bat, Mormoops megalophylla LR/lc
Genus: Pteronotus
 Naked-backed bat, Pteronotus davyi LR/lc
 Wagner's mustached bat, Pteronotus personatus LR/lc (Trinidad only)
Family: Phyllostomidae
Subfamily: Phyllostominae
Genus: Glyphonycteris
 Davies's big-eared bat, Glyphonycteris daviesi LR/nt
 Tricolored big-eared bat, Glyphonycteris sylvestris LR/nt
Genus: Lampronycteris
 Yellow-throated big-eared bat, Lampronycteris brachyotis LR/lc
Genus: Lonchorhina
 Tomes's sword-nosed bat, Lonchorhina aurita LR/lc
Genus: Lophostoma
 Pygmy round-eared bat, Lophostoma brasiliense LR/lc
Genus: Micronycteris
 Hairy big-eared bat, Micronycteris hirsuta LR/lc
 Little big-eared bat, Micronycteris megalotis LR/lc
 White-bellied big-eared bat, Micronycteris minuta LR/lc
Genus: Mimon
 Striped hairy-nosed bat, Mimon crenulatum LR/lc
Genus: Phylloderma
 Pale-faced bat, Phylloderma stenops LR/lc
Genus: Phyllostomus
 Pale spear-nosed bat, Phyllostomus discolor LR/lc
 Greater spear-nosed bat, Phyllostomus hastatus LR/lc
Genus: Tonatia
 Stripe-headed round-eared bat, Tonatia saurophila LR/lc
Genus: Trachops
 Fringe-lipped bat, Trachops cirrhosus LR/lc
Genus: Trinycteris
 Niceforo's big-eared bat, Trinycteris nicefori LR/lc
Genus: Vampyrum
 Spectral bat, Vampyrum spectrum LR/nt
Subfamily: Glossophaginae
Genus: Anoura
 Geoffroy's tailless bat, Anoura geoffroyi LR/lc (Trinidad only)
Genus: Choeroniscus
 Intermediate long-tailed bat, Choeroniscus intermedius LR/nt
Genus: Glossophaga
 Miller's long-tongued bat, Glossophaga longirostris LR/lc
 Pallas's long-tongued bat, Glossophaga soricina LR/lc
Subfamily: Carolliinae
Genus: Carollia
 Seba's short-tailed bat, Carollia perspicillata LR/lc 
Subfamily: Stenodermatinae
Genus: Ametrida
 Little white-shouldered bat, Ametrida centurio LR/lc
Genus: Artibeus
 Jamaican fruit bat, Artibeus jamaicensis LR/lc 
 Great fruit-eating bat, Artibeus lituratus LR/lc 
Genus: Centurio
 Wrinkle-faced bat, Centurio senex LR/lc 
Genus: Chiroderma
 Little big-eyed bat, Chiroderma trinitatum LR/lc
 Hairy big-eyed bat, Chiroderma villosum LR/lc
Genus: Mesophylla
 MacConnell's bat, Mesophylla macconnelli LR/lc
Genus: Sturnira
 Tilda's yellow-shouldered bat, Sturnira tildae LR/lc
Genus: Uroderma
 Tent-making bat, Uroderma bilobatum LR/lc
Genus: Vampyrodes
 Great stripe-faced bat, Vampyrodes caraccioli LR/lc
Genus: Platyrrhinus
 Heller's broad-nosed bat, Platyrrhinus helleri LR/lc
Subfamily: Desmodontinae
Genus: Desmodus
 Common vampire bat, Desmodus rotundus LR/lc
Genus: Diaemus
 White-winged vampire bat, Diaemus youngi LR/lc
Family: Furipteridae
Genus: Furipterus
 Thumbless bat, Furipterus horrens LR/lc

Order: Cetacea (whales)

The order Cetacea includes whales, dolphins and porpoises. They are the mammals most fully adapted to aquatic life with a spindle-shaped nearly hairless body, protected by a thick layer of blubber, and forelimbs and tail modified to provide propulsion underwater.

Trinidad and Tobago is within the worldwide ranges of twenty eight cetacean species. Nineteen of these cetacean species have been recorded in Trinidad and Tobago waters and it is expected that more species will be recorded as cetacean research progresses in this area.

Suborder: Mysticeti
Family: Balaenopteridae (baleen whales)
Genus: Balaenoptera 
 Common minke whale, Balaenoptera acutorostrata
 Sei whale, Balaenoptera borealis
 Bryde's whale, Balaenoptera brydei
 Blue whale, Balaenoptera musculus
Genus: Megaptera
 Humpback whale, Megaptera novaeangliae
Suborder: Odontoceti
Superfamily: Platanistoidea
Family: Delphinidae (marine dolphins)
Genus: Delphinus
 Short-beaked common dolphin, Delphinus delphis DD
Genus: Feresa
 Pygmy killer whale, Feresa attenuata DD
Genus: Globicephala
 Short-finned pilot whale, Globicephala macrorhyncus DD
Genus: Lagenodelphis
 Fraser's dolphin, Lagenodelphis hosei DD
Genus: Grampus
 Risso's dolphin, Grampus griseus DD
Genus: Orcinus
 Killer whale, Orcinus orca DD
Genus: Peponocephala
 Melon-headed whale, Peponocephala electra DD
Genus: Pseudorca
 False killer whale, Pseudorca crassidens DD
Genus: Sotalia
 Guiana dolphin, Sotalia guianensis DD
Genus: Stenella
 Pantropical spotted dolphin, Stenella attenuata DD
 Clymene dolphin, Stenella clymene DD
 Striped dolphin, Stenella coeruleoalba DD
 Atlantic spotted dolphin, Stenella frontalis DD
 Spinner dolphin, Stenella longirostris DD
Genus: Steno
 Rough-toothed dolphin, Steno bredanensis DD
Genus: Tursiops
 Common bottlenose dolphin, Tursiops truncatus
Family: Physeteridae (sperm whales)
Genus: Physeter
 Sperm whale, Physeter catodon DD
Family: Kogiidae (dwarf sperm whales)
Genus: Kogia
 Pygmy sperm whale, Kogia breviceps DD
 Dwarf sperm whale, Kogia sima DD
Superfamily Ziphioidea
Family: Ziphidae (beaked whales)
Genus: Mesoplodon
 Gervais' beaked whale, Mesoplodon europaeus DD)
Genus: Ziphius
 Cuvier's beaked whale, Ziphius cavirostris DD

Order: Carnivora (carnivorans)

There are over 260 species of carnivorans, the majority of which feed primarily on meat. They have a characteristic skull shape and dentition.

Suborder: Feliformia
Family: Felidae (cats)
Subfamily: Felinae
Genus: Leopardus
 Ocelot, L. pardalis   (Trinidad only)
Family: Herpestidae (moongooses)
Subfamily: Herpestinae
Genus: Urva
 Small Indian mongoose, U. auropunctata  introduced (Trinidad only)
Suborder: Caniformia
Family: Procyonidae (raccoons)
Genus: Procyon
 Crab-eating raccoon, P. cancrivorus  
Family: Mustelidae (mustelids)
Genus: Eira
 Tayra, E. barbara   (Trinidad only)
Genus: Lontra
 Neotropical river otter, L. longicaudis   (Trinidad only)

Order: Artiodactyla (even-toed ungulates)

The even-toed ungulates are ungulates whose weight is borne about equally by the third and fourth toes, rather than mostly or entirely by the third as in perissodactyls. There are about 220 artiodactyl species, including many that are of great economic importance to humans.

Family: Tayassuidae (peccaries)
Genus: Dicotyles
 Collared peccary, D. tajacu LC (Trinidad)
Family: Cervidae (deer)
Subfamily: Capreolinae
Genus: Mazama
 Red brocket, M. americana DD (Trinidad only; extirpated from Tobago)

See also
List of chordate orders
Lists of mammals by region
List of prehistoric mammals
Mammal classification
List of mammals described in the 2000s

Notes

References
 

 Cetacean Conservation and Research Organization website. Retrieved on 25 October 2013
 Eisenberg, J.F. 1989. "Mammals of the Neotropics, Volume 1: The Northern Neotropics: Panama, Colombia, Venezuela, Guyana, Suriname, French Guiana". University of Chicago Press.

Trinidad and Tobago
Mammals
 Mammals
Trinidad and Tobago